Columbus Circle is a 2012 American independent thriller film directed by George Gallo and co-written by Gallo and Kevin Pollak. The film stars Selma Blair, Giovanni Ribisi, Beau Bridges, Amy Smart, Jason Lee, and Kevin Pollak.  The film was released directly to video in the United States on March 6, 2012.  Producer Christopher Mallick is accused of stealing millions of dollars from customers of his now defunct billing company "ePassporte" to fund the production of his films.

This was Robert Guillaume's last film before his retirement in 2014 and his death on October 24, 2017.

Summary
The film is about an heiress who has shut herself inside her Columbus Circle apartment for nearly two decades. A detective investigating the death of one of her neighbors and the duo who move into the subsequently vacant apartment force her to face her fears of the outside world.

Cast

Production
Filming took place in Los Angeles.

References

External links
 
 

2012 direct-to-video films
2012 films
2012 independent films
2012 thriller films
American independent films
American thriller films
Films directed by George Gallo
Films scored by Brian Tyler
Films set in apartment buildings
Films set in Manhattan
Films shot in Los Angeles
2010s English-language films
2010s American films